Ille-et-Vilaine is a department of France, located in the region of Brittany in the northwest of the country. It is named after the two rivers of the Ille and the Vilaine. It had a population of 1,079,498 in 2019.

History 
Ille-et-Vilaine is one of the original 83 departments created during the French Revolution on March 4, 1790. It was created from part of the province of Brittany.

Geography 
Ille-et-Vilaine is a part of the current region of Brittany and it is bordered by the departments of Manche to the north-east, Mayenne to the east, Maine-et-Loire to the south-east, Loire-Atlantique to the south, Morbihan to the south-west, and Côtes-d'Armor to the west and north-west – France's shortest administrative department boundary at 20 yards (19 metres), although this was not the case with the department boundary. Also the English Channel (la Manche in French) borders the department to the north.

The department is named after its two main rivers, the Ille and the Vilaine, whose confluence is in Rennes, the capital of the department and of the region.  Other important rivers include:
 the Rance, that borders the department in the north-west and flows to the north, creating a deep fjord before reaching the English Channel on the western part of the coast (named Côte d'Émeraude) between the cities of Dinard and Saint-Malo); the Rance river is connected from the west of the department to the Ille river in the north-west suburbs of Rennes with a navigable channel (then the Ille river is channelized to join the Vilaine up to the center of the city of Rennes);
 and the Couesnon that borders the eastern part of the department and which reaches the eastern part of the coast of the English Channel, in the flat Bay of the Mont Saint-Michel.

The department is moderately elevated above the level of the sea, with many hills; however the central part has a dense network of many tributaries to the Ille or the Vilaine from all around the large basin of Rennes. The elevated hills bordering this basin are covered by several old forests now exploited by men for the production of wood. The basin itself is a rich agriculture area, as well as the north-west of the department near the Rance.

In the extreme south of the department the Vilaine goes through a slower decrease in elevation in a small corridor in the area of the city of Redon; in this area, the Vilaine is known for its frequent floods during its recent history, often because of too-intensive draining of agricultural areas around Rennes (some floods also affected some parts of Rennes up to the 1980s due to incorrect management of old equipment of the canal of Ille-et-Rance). To avoid these hazards within inhabited cities, some natural fields bordering the Vilaine in the south of the department are now left floodable, and works for regulating the level have been done including, small artificial lakes with derivation channels, replanting trees in the basin, better management of forests, and regulating the artificial drains made for agriculture.

Principal towns

The most populous commune is Rennes, the prefecture. As of 2019, there are 6 communes with more than 15,000 inhabitants:

Demographics
The population has grown rapidly over the last few decades and was estimated at 1,051,779 in January 2016.

Population development since 1801:

Language 
Gallo is a historic minority language spoken in eastern Brittany. Gallo and Breton are both studied at the University of Rennes.

Breton 
Historically, the Breton language was little spoken in the eastern part of Brittany, and this was one of the first regions where the language disappeared such that Breton was not spoken for many centuries.

Today, Breton is again spoken due to schools teaching Breton, and due to a small immigration from Western Brittany to Eastern Brittany, where there are more cities with growing industries and external investment and therefore more work. A recent study shows that Breton speakers in this region represent 3.3% of the total number of Breton speakers. The Breton speakers aged 18–30 in this region represent 12.7% of the total number of Breton speakers of that age group. This is because there are relatively few elder speakers but many people are learning the language. The study says that about 1,800 people are learning it (this includes one Diwan school in Rennes, some bilingual public and catholic schools, and evening courses).

Politics

The President of the Departmental Council is the Socialist Jean-Luc Chenut since the 2015 French departmental elections, re-elected in 2021.

The city of Rennes and its suburbs are the original base of the rapid Socialist growth in the department. The city has been governed by Socialist Mayors since 1977, notably by Edmond Hervé between 1977 and 2008. Since then, the growth of middle-class suburbs have helped the Socialists, who have been rapidly gaining strength in those formerly right-leaning areas.

The right remains strong in a strongly Catholic (clerical) area from outside Redon to Vitré or Fougères. In addition, the right is strong in the wealthy coastal area of Saint-Malo and Dinard.

Presidential elections 2nd round

Current National Assembly Representatives

Tourism

See also 
 Cantons of the Ille-et-Vilaine department
 Communes of the Ille-et-Vilaine department
 Arrondissements of the Ille-et-Vilaine department

References

External links 

  Prefecture website
  Departmental Council website

  
  Cultural Heritage

 
1790 establishments in France
Departments of Brittany
States and territories established in 1790